Hopewell Project may refer to:
The Hopewell Project, a solar-powered residence in Hopewell, New Jersey.
The Bangkok Elevated Road and Train System, commonly known as the Hopewell Project, a failed elevated highway and rail construction project in Bangkok.